The Journal of Neuroscience Methods is a peer-reviewed scientific journal covering scientific techniques and protocols used in any branch of neuroscience research. It was established in 1979. The editor-in-chief is Giuseppe Di Giovanni, Professor of Neuroscience at the University of Malta and Honorary Professor at Cardiff University, UK. Journal Neuroscience Methods is published 18 times a year by Elsevier.     

Associate Editors: Vince Calhoun (The Mind Research Network, Albuquerque, New Mexico, USA), David Carter (Cardiff University, Cardiff, UK), Philippe De Deurwaerdère (Université de Bordeaux, Bordeaux Cedex, France), Robert Hampson (Wake Forest University Health Sciences, Winston-Salem, North Carolina, USA), Liset Menendez de la Prida (Consejo Superior de Investigaciones Científicas (CSIC), Madrid, Spain), Gernot Riedel (University of Aberdeen, Foresterhill, Scotland, UK), Floris Wouterlood (Vrije Universiteit Amsterdam, Amsterdam, Netherlands).

Previous editors in Chief: Vincenzo Crunelli (Cardiff University, Cardiff, UK), Greg Gerhardt (University of Kentucky, Chandler Medical Centre, Lexington, Kentucky, USA), J.S. Kelly (Department of Pharmacology, University of Edinburgh, Edinburgh, UK) and N. Bowery (University of Birmingham, Birmingham, UK).

Abstracting and indexing
The journal is abstracted and indexed in:

According to the Journal Citation Reports (JCR), the journal has a 2018 impact factor of 2.785, ranking it 31st out of 79 journals in the category "Biochemical Research Methods" and  135th out of 267 journals in the category "Neurosciences".

References

External links

Neuroscience journals
English-language journals
Elsevier academic journals
Publications established in 1979